"History" is a song by British-Irish boy band One Direction. It was released on 6 November 2015 as the third and final single from their fifth studio album, Made in the A.M. (2015). It was also the final single released by the group before their hiatus began in January 2016, with members of the band focusing on their solo projects. "History" peaked at number six on the UK Singles Chart.

Composition 
“History” was written by members Liam Payne and Louis Tomlinson, along with Wayne Hector, Ed Drewett and the band's regular collaborators Julian Bunetta and John Ryan.

Release
The song was chosen as the third and final single from Made in the A.M. after the commercial success that followed the band's performance on the finale of British The X Factor. The song was released by Syco Music on 6 November 2015 and served as the band's last single before their hiatus.

Music video
The music video, directed by Ben Winston, was released on the band's Vevo channel, via YouTube, on 26 January 2016. It features clips of the band throughout the years, highlighting their tours and personal anecdotes and including clips of former member Zayn Malik. The video ends as the band walks off in separate directions; it was later confirmed that the band was originally supposed to run back together. Director Winston said, "The ending wasn't supposed to look like they're just walking off in different directions, it was kind of like a 'see you in a bit, guys.'" In 2017, the deleted clip was unveiled online. "History" was the last One Direction song released before the band went on hiatus.

Critical reception
Madeline Roth of MTV News commented, "littered with hand claps and campfire singalong vibes, "History" is both nostalgic and forward-looking at the same time" and that "the song is "the perfect goodbye to their fans". Brennan Carley, writing with Spin, wrote that "utilizing hand claps, acoustic guitar, and Harry Styles' sweet, standout harmonizing, the song's proof that each of the remaining four 1D singers will be just fine on their own". Brittany Spanos of Rolling Stone wrote that the group went "rootsy" with the song, while adding that "the quartet harmonize above acoustic guitars and hand claps" and that "the boy band's latest veers sharply from the more anthemic, arena rock sounds of their most recent singles". Lucy Wang, writing for Time, wrote that the song is a "crooning, bittersweet anthem" and "a celebration of the British boy band’s five-year journey alongside its fans".

Charts

Weekly charts

Year-end charts

Certifications

References

2015 songs
2015 singles
Songs written by Wayne Hector
Songs written by John Ryan (musician)
Songs written by Ed Drewett
Songs written by Liam Payne
Songs written by Julian Bunetta
Songs written by Louis Tomlinson
One Direction songs
Pop ballads